María Salazar may refer to:
 María Elvira Salazar (born 1961), American journalist, author, and politician
 María Guadalupe Salazar (born 1943), Mexican politician
 María Isabel Salazar (born 1980), Bolivian footballer